Sigmund Sternberger House is a historic home located at Greensboro, Guilford County, North Carolina. It was designed by architect Harry Barton and built in 1926. It is a two-story villa in the  Renaissance Revival style.  It is constructed of deep red bricks, green ceramic tiles, and sculpted gray limestone.  The house features arcades and Venetian-arched porches. Also on the property are two contributing outbuildings and a contributing brick retaining wall.  It has served at the home of the Sternberger Artists' Center since 1964.

It was listed on the National Register of Historic Places in 1993.  It is located in the Summit Avenue Historic District.

References

Houses on the National Register of Historic Places in North Carolina
Renaissance Revival architecture in North Carolina
Houses completed in 1926
Houses in Greensboro, North Carolina
National Register of Historic Places in Guilford County, North Carolina
Historic district contributing properties in North Carolina